Swimming was contested at the 1954 Asian Games in Manila, Philippine from May 5 to May 8, 1954.

Medalists

Men

Women

Medal table

References 
 Sports 123: Asian Games

External links 
 Second Asian Games Manila 1954

 
1954 Asian Games events
1954
Asian Games
1954 Asian Games